Christmas Together is a Christmas duets studio album by American country music artists Garth Brooks and Trisha Yearwood, released by Pearl Records on November 11, 2016.

Background

Although Trisha Yearwood had recorded with her husband Garth Brooks before and sang backing vocals on many of his songs, this album is their first joint album. It is a mix of familiar favorites and some new songs, however only some of these song are duets. It was released on November 11, 2016, the same day that Brooks' 10-disc box set, The Ultimate Collection, was released via Target. A Walmart exclusive that bundled Christmas Together with Brooks' new album Gunslinger was released a week later.

Reception
The album debuted at No. 1 on the Top Country Albums and No. 2 on the Top Holiday Albums chart, with 21,000 copies sold in its first week.  It has sold 194,800 copies in the United States as of November 2017.

The Walmart exclusive bundled with Gunslinger debuted at No. 14 with 6,600 copies sold, and reached No. 3 on that chart the following week, selling 23,000 copies that week.  The bundle has sold 81,700 copies as of January 2017.

Track listing

Personnel 
Adapted from liner notes.
 Garth Brooks – lead vocals, backing vocals
 Trisha Yearwood – lead vocals, backing vocals
 Bobby Wood – keyboards 
 Billy Panda – acoustic guitars
 James Taylor – acoustic guitar (11), lead and backing vocals (11)
 Chris Leuzinger – electric guitars
 Bruce Bouton – steel guitar
 Stuart Duncan – mandolin
 Mike Chapman – bass
 Michael Rhodes – bass
 Sam Bacco – drums, percussion
 Milton Sledge – drums, percussion
 Rob Hajacos – fiddle
 Dennis Burnside – string, horn and woodwind arrangements
 Carl Gorodetzky – contractor
 Tania Hancheroff – backing vocals (2-6)
Jon Mark Ivey – backing vocals (2-6)
 Shane McConnell – backing vocals (2-6)
 Lisa Silver – backing vocals (2-6)
 Kira Small – backing vocals (2-6)
 Bergen White – backing vocals (2-6), BGV arrangements (2-6)
 Kim Taylor – backing vocals (11)

The Nashville String Machine
 David Angell, Monisa Angell, Bruce Christensen, Janet Darnell, David Davidson, Beverly Drukker, Connie Ellisor, Jim Grosjean, Anthony LaMarchina, Stefan Petrescu, Carole Rabinowitz, Julie Tanner, Alan Umstead, Cathy Umstead, Mary Katherine Vanosdale, Katelyn Westergard, Bruce Wethey, Kris Wilkinson and Karen Winklemann – strings

 Roy Agee, Jeff Bailey, Preston Bailey, Barry Green, Mike Haynes, Prentiss Hobbs, Chris McDonald and Steve Patrick – horns

 Jimmy Bowland, Sam Levine, Kelsey Mire, Doug Moffet, Robbie Shankle – woodwinds

Ugly Christmas Sweater Choir
 Roy Agee, Jeff Bailey, Preston Bailey, Garth Brooks, Barry Green, Mike Haynes, Prentiss Hobbs, Sam Horowitz, Slide Jackson, John Martin, Chris McDonald, Kelsey Mire, Doug Moffet and Steve Patrick

Production 
 Mark Miller – producer 
 Matthew Allen – recording, mixing 
 John Kelton – additional engineer 
 Don Cobb – mastering 
 Eric Conn – mastering
 Independent Mastering (Nashville, Tennessee) – mastering location 
 Luellyn Latocki Hensley – art direction 
 Jeff Crump – design 
 Sally Carns Gulde – design 
 Jeremy Cowart – photography 
 Russ Harrington – photography

Charts

Weekly charts

Year-end charts

Certifications

References

2016 Christmas albums
Christmas albums by American artists
Country Christmas albums
Garth Brooks albums
Trisha Yearwood albums
Vocal duet albums